Carex lambertiana is a species of sedge that was first described by Francis Boott in 1853.

References

lambertiana
Plants described in 1853